O20 or O-20 may refer to:
 , a submarine of the Royal Netherlands Navy
 Kingdon Airpark, in California, United States
 Otoyol 20, a motorway in Ankara, Turkey
 Oxygen-20, an isotope of oxygen